Potassium ferrooxalate, also known as potassium bisoxalatoferrate(II), is a salt with the formula [], sometimes abbreviated .  The ferrooxalate anion (negative ion)  is a transition metal complex, consisting of an atom of iron in the +2 oxidation state bound to two bidentate oxalate ions .  The anion charge is balanced by two cations (positive ions) of potassium .

The anhydrous salt is orange-yellow and dissolves in water to give a red solution. Crystals of the dihydrate []·2 are golden yellow in color.

Potassium ferrooxalate is believed to be formed when the related compound potassium ferrioxalate [] is decomposed by light in solution (a common method of actinometry) or heated above 296 °C.

Preparation
While the ferrooxalate anion had been previously identified in solution, the solid salt was described only in 1992, by J. Ladriere. He obtained it by dissolving the appropriate amounts of potassium oxalate dihydrate ·2 and iron(II) oxalate dihydrate ·2 in boiling water, partially evaporating the red solution, and cooling it to room temperature, when gold-yellow crystals of K2Fe(ox)2·2 precipitated.

Properties

Thermal decomposition 

The dihydrate loses two water molecules at 200 °C.

The anhydrous salt is stable in the absence of oxygen up to about 470 °C, when it decomposes into potassium oxalate and ferrous oxide  (which disproportionates partly into magnetite , metallic iron, and cementite ).

See also
A number of other iron oxalates are known
 Iron(II) oxalate
 Iron(III) oxalate
 Sodium ferrioxalate

References

Iron complexes
Iron(II) compounds
Potassium compounds
Oxalato complexes